Mari Hamada Complete Single Collection is a box set by Japanese singer/songwriter Mari Hamada, released on January 8, 2014, by Victor Entertainment to commemorate the 30th anniversary of her music career. The boxed set consists of four discs in Super High Material CD (SHM-CD) format and two DVDs, plus a booklet containing photos and an interview with Hamada.

Mari Hamada Complete Single Collection peaked at No. 19 on Oricon's albums chart.

Track listing

Charts

References

External links 
  (Mari Hamada)
  (Victor Entertainment)
 

2014 compilation albums
2014 video albums
Japanese-language compilation albums
Mari Hamada compilation albums
Victor Entertainment compilation albums